Constance Adams DeMille (April 27, 1873 – July 17, 1960) was an American actress and wife of filmmaker Cecil B. DeMille.

Early life
Born in Orange, New Jersey, DeMille was the daughter of Judge Fredrick Adams, New Jersey Court of Errors and Appeals, and Ella Adams, his first wife. She was raised in East Orange, New Jersey. Adams married a second time to a woman also named Ella.

Career
After graduating from school, Constance headed for the stage. She appeared briefly in Hearts are Trumps in Washington, D. C. and on Broadway, starring in The Man on the Box, from October 1905 to January 1906. She appeared in only one film, playing the part of 'Mrs. Rowland' in Where the Trail Divides (1914). In 1920 while still associated with Famous Players-Lasky, her husband formed his own new company Cecil B. DeMille Productions with his lawyer, Constance and his sister-in-law Ella King Adams who also worked as his script reader.

Personal life
While performing, she met and later married Cecil Blount DeMille. They married on August 16, 1902, at her parents' home 77 Washington Street, East Orange, New Jersey. The bride's sister Rebecca Appleton Adams was her maid of honor. DeMille's brother William C. DeMille, was his best man. The residence (later replaced by a 1925-built home at the same 77 Washington Street address) was decorated with flowers and palms. Following a reception there, the DeMilles went on honeymoon, before setting up a residence in New York City. The DeMilles first met in Washington, D.C. where she had joined the company of the play Hearts are Trumps. The play marked his first appearance on stage, and it had played for many months in New York before it went on the road. Her father was not enthusiastic about the match for his daughter, hence a small wedding at home. Their marriage lasted 56 years, until his death. They had one daughter by birth, Cecilia, and adopted Katherine, John and Richard. Richard DeMille was raised as their adopted son but was in fact the son of Cecil's brother William and Lorna Moon. Richard DeMille wrote about his background in the book My Secret Mother: Lorna Moon.

Death
On July 17, 1960, DeMille died of pneumonia in Hollywood, aged 86. She is buried in Hollywood Memorial Park Cemetery and is remembered by a memorial banyan tree she planted in 1933 along Hilo, Hawaii's Banyan Drive.

References

American stage actresses
American film actresses
1873 births
1960 deaths
People from Orange, New Jersey
20th-century American actresses
Contsance Adams